Christoph Menz (born 22 December 1988) is a German professional footballer who plays as a defender for BFC Preussen.

Career
In August 2018, Menz agreed the termination of his contract with Fortuna Köln.

References

External links
 
 

1988 births
Sportspeople from Magdeburg
Living people
Association football midfielders
German footballers
1. FC Union Berlin players
Dynamo Dresden players
FC Rot-Weiß Erfurt players
SC Fortuna Köln players
Eintracht Braunschweig players
FC Viktoria 1889 Berlin players
BFC Preussen players
2. Bundesliga players
3. Liga players
Regionalliga players